Thockrington is a village and former civil parish, now in the parish of Bavington, in Northumberland, England. In 1951 the parish had a population of 18.

Governance 
Thockrington is in the parliamentary constituency of Hexham. The parish was abolished on 1 April 1955 to form Bavington.

Religious sites 
Thockrington church, which stands so prominently on a spur of the Great Whin Sill, is one of the oldest churches in the county. The church is dedicated to St Aidan.

Here are buried several members of the ancient family of Shafto, the earliest mention of whom is in 1240. The Shaftos lived at nearby Bavington until the eighteenth century when, as a result of their support of the Jacobite cause in 1715, their estates were confiscated by the Crown, and ultimately sold to a Delaval. The Shaftos had connections with the county of Durham and lived on their Durham estates until 1953, when Mr R. D. Shafto returned to Bavington Hall.

Landmarks 

A little over a mile south-west of the village are the ruins of Little Swinburne Tower, a fifteenth-century pele tower.

Notable people
 Lord Beveridge, founder of the modern welfare state, is buried in the churchyard
 The author Tom Sharpe's ashes were buried in the churchyard in 2014 by his Spanish partner, witnessed by a Spanish TV crew. Sharpe's father was once vicar of Thockrington.
 The aviatrix, Connie Leathart (1903–93), is buried here; her remains are marked by a simple stone bearing the initials "CL".

References

External links

GENUKI (Accessed: 19 November 2008)

Villages in Northumberland
Former civil parishes in Northumberland